Tongseng is an Indonesian goat meat, mutton or beef stew dish in curry-like soup with vegetables and kecap manis (sweet soy sauce). Tongseng is commonly found in Indonesian region of Central Java; from Surakarta to Yogyakarta. However, it is believed that dish was originated from Klego district in Boyolali, Central Java.

Ingredients and cooking method
The term tongseng derived from Javanese term osengan which refer to "stir frying" to describes its cooking method. It also refer to the "seng" friction sounds of metal frying spoon against metal wok.

The soup is made of ground mixture of garlic, shallot, black pepper, ginger, coriander, galangal, daun salam (Indonesian bay leaves), and lemongrass sauteed with palm oil until it gets aromatic. The diced meat then poured into the sauteed mixture until cooked. Usually the uncooked goat meat from sate kambing (goat satay) are used. Add water until it boiled and add sweet soy sauce with tamarind juice. After the boiled mixture reduces, shredded cabbages and sliced tomato are add to add fresh and crisp texture. Some versions are prepared using coconut milk. Slices of bird's eye chili might be added for those who prefers extra hot and spicy tongseng soup.

Tongseng is usually served with hot steamed rice. The soup of tongseng is similar to gulai soup, however gulai is cooked without sweet soy sauce while tongseng mostly appears in brownish gold colour because of the addition of sweet soy sauce. Gulai usually uses beef's offal while tongseng usually only uses meat (goat, lamb, mutton or beef).

History

Traditionally, tongseng is considered as the merge between goat satay and gulai spicy soup. According to Indonesian culinary expert, tongseng started to appear in Java between the 18th to 19th century CE. At that time, during colonial era, there were significant influx of Arabs and Muslim Indians migrated into Indonesian archipelago. The Arabs settlers introduced and promoted goat, lamb and mutton as their preferred meat, thus several dishes influenced by Arab and Muslim Indian culinary traditions were introduced to Java. Among others are sate kambing, which was believed to be the local adaptation of Indian-Muslim kebabs and gulai, which was a local adaptation of curry-based soup probably influenced by Indian cuisine.

During the 19th century, the southern area of Central Java was developed as sugar plantation, thus sugar mills were built. Next to common sugar, traditional Javanese palm sugar (gula jawa) were also produced in the region. Soy sauce factory also built in the region, as the result local Javanese developed kecap manis, which is sweet soy sauce made of a mixture of soy sauce and palm sugar. This sweet soy sauce become the main sauce that combine the savoury gulai soup with pieces of goat satay and the fresh crisp of cabbages and tomato.

Today, tongseng is a common dish in Javanese cities of Boyolali, Surakarta (Solo), Klaten, and Yogyakarta, thus most of tongseng sellers hailed from those towns. The dish is also can be found in Indonesian major cities, such as Jakarta, Bandung, Semarang and Surabaya. Tongseng sellers usually marketed themselves as Warung Sate Solo, a warung or small modest restaurant that specialized in offering satay, tongseng and gulai as their main fare.

See also

 List of goat dishes
 List of Indonesian soups

References

External links

Tongseng recipe (in Indonesian)

Indonesian soups
Javanese cuisine
Goat dishes
Indonesian curries
Lamb dishes